The 2009–10 Serie D was the sixty-second edition of the top level Italian non-professional football championship. It represented the fifth tier in the Italian football league system. It consisted of 167 divided into six 18-team divisions, one 19-team division and two 20-team divisions.

The regular Serie D season started September 6, 2009. Each team played two matches against every other team in its own division; a total of 34 matches for 18-team divisions, 36 matches for the 19-team divisions, and 38 matches for the 20-team division. The nine division winners were automatically promoted to Lega Pro Seconda Divisione for the 2009–10 season, while the two last-placed teams are automatically relegated to Eccellenza.

After the regular season is complete, teams placed 6th-last through to 3rd-last in each division play a double-leg series (6th-last vs 3rd-last, 5th-last vs 4th-last) where the winners remain in Serie D the following season and the two losers are also relegated to Eccellenza for a total of 4 relegations in each division, 36 in total for the league. There are no playoffs if the difference between two teams is bigger than eight points.

The nine division winners enter a tournament to determine the over-all Serie D champion and is awarded the Scudetto Dilettanti.

Teams placed second through fifth in each division enter a playoff tournament after the regular season as well. Eventually, a final game determines which team finishes first and which teams comes in second in this 36-team playoff, and these teams may be bumped up to Lega Pro Seconda Divisione if one or more current Seconda Divisione teams runs into financial difficulties or is penalized.

Events

Start of season 
Given a normal season where there are no team failures and special promotions, Serie D would feature 9 teams that had been relegated from Lega Pro Seconda Divisione, 36 teams that had been promoted from Eccellenza, and 117 teams had played in Serie D the year before. Due to nine bankruptcies and non-admissions in the professional leagues above Serie D and eight bankruptcies or promotions to fill vacancies in Serie D, the 2009–10 season was to feature only 5 teams that played in Serie C2 2008-09, 40 teams that played in 2008–09 Eccellenza, and 121 teams that played in 2008–09 Serie D. The league also admitted three of the teams that had failed in the senior leagues. Pisa & Avellino, both of whom played in 2008–09 Serie B, were placed in Girone D & Girone I respectively. Venezia which played in Serie C1 2008-09 was placed in Girone C.The league admitted on team more from Eccellenza L'Aquila, which was first in its Girone two games before the end and couldn't play them because of the earthquake, and was placed in Girone F. Finally, 167 teams will compete in Serie D 2009-10.

Promotions 
The nine division winners are automatically promoted to Lega Pro Seconda Divisione 2010–11.

On April 11, 2010 Tritium became the first team to get promoted from Serie D in the season, winning the Girone B in advance of five weeks after a 2–1 win at Darfo Boario.

It was followed one week later by Savona won Girone A in Week 30 after a 1–1 draw at Acqui with four games to go, Montichiari won Girone C in Week 34 after a 3–1 win at home to Montebelluna with four games to go and Pisa won Girone D in Week 34 after a 1–0 win at home to Pontedera with four games to go on April 18.

One week later Neapolis Mugnano won Girone H and in Week 35 after a 1–0 win at home to Matera with three games to go on April 24.

In Week 33, on May 9 Gavorrano despite a 3–0 loss to Calenzano by the authorities winning Girone E and Fondi after a 2–2 draw at home to Boville Ernica winning Girone G.

On the final day of the season in Week 34 Chieti after a 2–1 win at Real Montecchio on May 16 winning Girone F and Milazzo after a 3–2 win at Mazara on May 16 winning Girone I.

Standings

Girone A 
Teams from Aosta Valley, Piedmont, Liguria, & Lombardy

Girone B 
Teams from Piedmont, Lombardy & Emilia-Romagna

Girone C 
Teams from Lombardy, Trentino-Alto Adige/Südtirol, Veneto & Friuli-Venezia Giulia

Girone D 
Teams from Lombardy, Veneto, Emilia-Romagna, Tuscany & Marche

Girone E 
Teams from Tuscany, Umbria & Lazio

Girone F 
Teams from Marche, Abruzzo & Molise

Girone G 
Teams from Lazio & Sardinia

Girone H 
Teams from Campania, Apulia, & Basilicata

Girone I 
Teams from Campania, Calabria, & Sicily

Division winners 
All teams promoted to 2010–11 Lega Pro Seconda Divisione except from Pisa which promoted to 2010–11 Lega Pro Prima Divisione

Scudetto Dilettanti

First round 
 Division winners placed into 3 groups of 3
 Group winners and best second-placed team qualify for semi-finals

Group 1

Group 2

Group 3

Semi-finals 
One leg played June 17, 2010
 On neutral ground at Forli, Stadio Comunale "Tullo Morgagni" On neutral ground at Sant'Arcangelo Romagna

 Final Played on June 26, 2010 On neutral ground at Forlì, Stadio Comunale "Tullo Morgagni".Winner:Montichiari Tie-breakers 

 Before the promotion playoffs and relegation playout could begin, two tie-breakers needed to be played.Girone I – 5th-6th place – played May 22, 2010The winner Avellino is qualified to promotion playoffs and the loser Rossanese remained in Serie D.Girone F – 12th-13th place – played May 30, 2010The winner Bojano remained in Serie D and the loser Angolana is forced to play in relegation playout.

 Promotion playoffs 

Promotion playoffs involved a total of 37 teams; four from each of the nine Serie D divisions (teams placed from 2nd through to 5th) with Matera, winner of Coppa Italia Serie D that is directly admitted to the Semi-final round.

 Rules 

 The first two rounds were one-legged matches played in the home field of the best-placed team.
 The games ending in ties were extended to extra time. New for the 2007–08 season, the higher classified team was declared the winner if the game was still tied after extra time. Penalty kicks were not taken.
 Round one matched 2nd & 5th-placed teams, and 3rd & 4th-placed teams within each division.
 The two winners from each division played each other in the second round.
 The nine winners – one each from the nine Serie D divisions – were then split into three groups of three teams each. Every team played two matches, one against each of the other two opponents within the group. The three group winners qualified for the semifinal round, joining Matera.
 The semi-finals were two-legged matches, and the respective winners moved on to play in a one-legged final hosted in a neutral ground.
 The tournament results provided a list, starting with the winner, by which vacancies could be filled in Lega Pro Seconda Divisione

 First round 
 Played on May 26, 2010 Single-legged matches played at best placed club home field: 2nd-placed team plays home 5th-placed team, 3rd-placed home team plays home 4th placed team
 Games ending in a tie are extended to extra time, if still tied, the higher-classified team wins

 Second round 
 Played on May 30, 2010 Single-legged matches played at best placed club home field
 Games ending in a tie are extended to extra time, if still tied, the higher-classified team wins

 Third round 
 group winners qualify for semi-finals

 Triangular 1 

 Triangular 2 

 Triangular 3 

 Semi-finals 
First legs played June 16, 2010; return legs played June 20, 2010

Matera qualified directly as winner of Coppa Italia Serie D

 Final 
Played on June 27, 2010 on neutral ground at Chieti, Stadio "Guido Angelini".Winner:Matera Relegation playout Played May 30 & June 6, 2010'''In case of aggregate tie score, higher classified team winsTeam highlighted in green saved, other is relegated to Eccellenza''

Footnotes 

Serie D seasons
5
Italy